Eduard van den Bril was a Belgian wrestler. He competed in the Greco-Roman heavyweight event at the 1920 Summer Olympics.

References

External links
 

Year of birth missing
Year of death missing
Olympic wrestlers of Belgium
Wrestlers at the 1920 Summer Olympics
Belgian male sport wrestlers
Place of birth missing